Alaskacephale was a genus of pachycephalosaurid dinosaur from the Prince Creek Formation, that lived in the early Maastrichtian stages of the Late Cretaceous (around 71 to 69  million years ago).

Discovery
Alaskacephale was named by Robert Sullivan in 2006. The genus name refers to Alaska, where the holotype was discovered, combined with the Greek kephale, meaning head. The species name, gangloffi, honors paleontologist Roland Gangloff. The only known specimen of A. gangloffi is the holotype UAM AK-493-V-001, found in 1999, a nearly complete left squamosal with a characteristic array of polygonal nodes. The dimensions of this bone suggest that A. gangloffi was about half the size of Pachycephalosaurus wyomingensis or three quarters the size of Prenocephale, and about the same size as Sphaerotholus edmontonensis and Foraminacephale.

The specimen was previously described by Gangloff et al. (2005) as an unnamed pachycephalosaurid, possibly a Pachycephalosaurus. Gangloff et al. described the squamosal as having an interdigitated suture with the quadrate, a feature previously described only in Pachycephalosaurus. Sullivan (2006) opined that this "suture" is instead a breakage point in both Alaskacephale and Pachycephalosaurus, so it could not be used to unite the two taxa.

Classification
Within the tribe Pachycephalosaurini, Alaskacephale is very closely related to Pachycephalosaurus wyomingensis. Below is a cladogram from Evans et al., 2021.

See also

 Timeline of pachycephalosaur research

References

Late Cretaceous dinosaurs of North America
Fossil taxa described in 2006
Pachycephalosaurs
Paleontology in Alaska
Campanian genus extinctions
Campanian genus first appearances
Ornithischian genera